Sir Christopher John MacRae Whitty  (born 21 April 1966) is a British epidemiologist  serving as Chief Medical Officer for England (CMO) and Chief Medical Adviser to the UK Government since 2019. He has also been Gresham Professor of Physic since 2018.

Whitty served as Chief Scientific Adviser (CSA) to the Department of Health and Social Care and Head of the National Institute for Health and Care Research (NIHR) from 2016 to 2021. He was also the Acting Government Chief Scientific Adviser from 2017 to 2018.

Since March 2020, Whitty has played a key role in the response to the COVID-19 pandemic in the United Kingdom, alongside Government Chief Scientific Adviser Sir Patrick Vallance. Whitty was appointed Knight Commander of the Order of the Bath (KCB) in the 2022 New Year Honours for services to public health.

Early life
Whitty was born in Gloucester, Gloucestershire, on 21 April 1966, the first of four sons born to Kenneth and Susannah Whitty. His father was a British Council officer, who was posted to various countries including Nigeria, where the family lived in Kaduna, and Malawi. While Deputy Director of the British Council in Athens, Kenneth Whitty was murdered by militants from the Abu Nidal Organisation, in 1984, when Whitty was 17. His mother was a teacher. His maternal uncle Sir Christopher MacRae was also a diplomat, and his grandmother Grace Summerhayes was a pioneering obstetrician in Africa, who set up the first maternity hospital in Ghana in 1928.

Whitty was sent back to the UK for his schooling, where he attended Windlesham House School in Pulborough, West Sussex, and Malvern College, Worcestershire. He then studied at Pembroke College, Oxford (BA in Physiology, DSc in medical science), Wolfson College, Oxford (BM BCh in Medicine, 1991, where he was also the founding chair of the National Postgraduate Committee), the London School of Hygiene & Tropical Medicine (DTM&H in Tropical Medicine and Hygiene, 1996; MSc in Epidemiology, 1996), Northumbria University (LLM in Medical Law, 2005), Heriot-Watt University (MBA in Business Administration, 2010), and the Open University (DipEcon in Economics).

Career
Whitty is a practising National Health Service (NHS) consultant physician at University College London Hospitals (UCLH) and the Hospital for Tropical Diseases, and Gresham Professor of Physic at Gresham College, a post dating back to 1597.  Until becoming CMO he was Professor of Public and International Health at the London School of Hygiene & Tropical Medicine (LSHTM) where he was also Director of the Malaria Centre. He worked as a physician and researcher into infectious diseases in the UK, Africa and Asia. In 2008 the Bill & Melinda Gates Foundation awarded the LSHTM £31 million for malaria research in Africa. At the time, Whitty was the principal investigator for the ACT Consortium, which conducted the research programme.

Government roles

From 2009 to 2015, he was Chief Scientific Adviser and director of research for the Department for International Development (DFID). He led the Research and Evidence Division, which worked on health, agriculture, climate change, energy, infrastructure, economic and governance research. During this time, with co-authors Neil Ferguson and Jeremy Farrar, he wrote an article in Nature titled "Infectious disease: Tough choices to reduce Ebola transmission", explaining the UK government's response to Ebola in support of the government of Sierra Leone, which he took a leading role in designing, including the proposal to build and support centres where people could self-isolate voluntarily if they suspected that they could have the disease.

From January 2016 to August 2021 he was Chief Scientific Adviser to the Department of Health and Social Care, responsible for the department's research and development work, including being Head of the National Institute for Health and Care Research (NIHR).

From 2017 to 2018, he was also interim Government Chief Scientific Adviser and head of the science and engineering profession in government. During this period Novichok, the military nerve agent, was responsible for the 2018 Salisbury poisonings, and Whitty chaired the government SAGE (Scientific Advisory Group in Emergencies) and advised COBR for the crisis.

He was appointed Chief Medical Officer (CMO) for England in 2019.

COVID-19 pandemic

Whitty and two of his deputies, Jenny Harries and Jonathan Van-Tam, took high-profile roles during the COVID-19 outbreak. This included appearing – often with prime minister Boris Johnson and Chief Scientific Adviser Sir Patrick Vallance – in televised news conferences, and giving evidence to parliamentary bodies. From 19 March, Whitty appeared in public information adverts on national television, explaining the government's social-distancing strategy to reduce the spread of the virus during the pandemic.

On 27 March, he was reported to be self-isolating owing to symptoms consistent with COVID-19 after Boris Johnson and Health Secretary Matt Hancock had tested positive for the virus. On 6 April, he had reportedly returned to work having recovered from the symptoms of the virus. In July, he told the Lords Science and Technology Committee that elimination of the disease in the UK would be very difficult, a view that was contested by other scientists including members of the Independent SAGE group.

At a televised briefing on 12 October where the Prime Minister introduced three tiers of localised restrictions, Whitty said he was not confident that the measures in the highest tier would be "enough to get on top of it". Whitty and Vallance presented updated data and forecasts at a televised briefing on 31 October, where the Prime Minister announced stricter measures for the whole of England.

During the outbreak, BBC health editor Hugh Pym called him "the official who will probably have the greatest impact on our everyday lives of any individual policymaker in modern times". The Guardians sketch writer, John Crace, described him as "the Geek-in-Chief, whom everyone now regards as the country's de facto prime minister". At the same time, he was compared to James Niven, the Scottish physician known for reducing the death rate of influenza during the 1918 flu pandemic in Manchester.

During the Christmas weekend of 2020, Whitty was spotted treating coronavirus patients in London. It was said he "worked the shifts in his capacity as a practising doctor [as] a consultant physician at University College London Hospitals Trust... on the north London hospital's respiratory ward over the weekend and bank holiday Monday".

On 26 June 2021 a group of COVID-19 protesters demonstrated outside what appeared to be Whitty's flat in central London. Earlier in the month Whitty was followed down a street by a prominent anti-vaccine activist who shouted at him for being a "liar" and in February he was also called a "liar" multiple times while waiting for a takeaway lunch at a street food stall.

On 27 June, Whitty was the subject of manhandling, described by Boris Johnson as "despicable harassment", by two members of the public in St James's Park, Westminster, who filmed the event for social media. The Health Secretary, Sajid Javid, said such behaviour would not be tolerated and that those responsible "should be ashamed". The Vaccines Minister, Nadhim Zahawi, said they were "thugs" and should face charges. The Metropolitan Police confirmed they were investigating the incident.  On 2 July a 23-year-old man from Romford, East London was charged with common assault. The man had previously apologised for any "upset" caused and said he had lost his job as an estate agent over the incident. On 6 July a second man, aged 24 and of no fixed address, was charged with common assault and with obstructing the police. On 30 July a man who admitted one charge of assault by beating was given an eight-week custodial sentence, suspended for two years, and a fine of £100. The trial for a second man who pleaded not guilty to the same charge commenced in December 2021, with the accused appearing by video link from his home. The trial had to be vacated until 4 January 2022, however, as he was unable to see the CCTV evidence via the video link.

Awards and honours
Whitty was appointed Companion of the Order of the Bath (CB) in the 2015 New Year Honours for public and voluntary service to Tropical Medicine in the UK and Africa. He is a fellow of the Academy of Medical Sciences.

Public lectures outlining his views on tackling current challenges in medicine and public health include over 20 Gresham lectures on topics such as infectious diseases, public health, cancer, cardiovascular diseases; and the 2017 Harveian Oration and the Milroy Lecture at the Royal College of Physicians.

In September 2021, Whitty was awarded an honorary doctorate from the University of Plymouth in recognition of his support for the university's medical science research community.

Whitty was appointed Knight Commander of the Order of the Bath (KCB) in the 2022 New Year Honours for services to public health.

Personal life
Whitty is described by those familiar with him as a private person. He is single and has no children.

Selected publications

References

Further reading

External links
 Publications vie Google Scholar. CJM Whitty
 Whitty, Prof. Christopher John Macrae at Who's Who

1966 births
Living people
People educated at Windlesham House School
People educated at Malvern College
Alumni of Pembroke College, Oxford
Alumni of Wolfson College, Oxford
Alumni of Northumbria University
Alumni of Heriot-Watt University
Alumni of the Open University
Chief Medical Officers for England
University College London Hospitals NHS Foundation Trust
Alumni of the London School of Hygiene & Tropical Medicine
Knights Commander of the Order of the Bath
Fellows of the Royal College of Physicians
Fellows of the Academy of Medical Sciences (United Kingdom)
British epidemiologists
People from Gloucester